Maharashtra Swaraj Party (MSP) is a regional political party formed by the Christian community native to Mumbai (Bombay) city and the Greater Bombay Metropolitan Area, in the Konkan division of India. The party's name draws inspiration from the phrase "Swaraj is my birthright", coined by a Bombay East Indian freedom fighter and Mumbai's first mayor of Indian origin, Joseph "Kaka" Baptista. Baptista was an associate and a confidant of Lokmanya Tilak who made the phrase popular.
The organisation, aimed at representing the East Indian community, was initiated by various local NGO's like Watchdog Foundation, Mobai Gaothan Panchayat, Bombay East Indian Association, Vakola Advanced Locality Management, Kalina Civic Forum& the Kolovery Welfare Association. MSP plans expand to the rest of Maharashtra.

2014 Maharashtra Assembly Election

The party fielded five candidates from Mumbai's suburbs in the 13th Maharashtra Legislative Assembly election. Since the organisation is not registered as a political party, the candidates were fielded as independents.

Names of candidates announced by the party include:

 Advocate Godfrey Pimenta - Vile Parle Vidhan Sabha Constituency 
 Advocate Vivian D’souza - Kalina Vidhan Sabha Constituency
 Advocate Shane Cardoz - Bandra (W) Vidhan Sabha  Constituency 
 Ashish Fernandes - Dahisar Vidhan Sabha Constituency
 Tony Dsouza - Malad (W) Vidhan Sabha Constituency.

References

Political parties established in 2014
Political parties in Maharashtra
Regionalist parties in India
2014 establishments in Maharashtra